Río Chico may refer to the following places:

Argentina
 Río Chico, Río Negro, a village and municipality in Río Negro Province
 Río Chico Department, Tucumán
 Río Chico Department, Santa Cruz
 Chico River (Santa Cruz)
 Río Chico de Nono

Chile
 Río Chico (Chile)

Venezuela
 Río Chico, Venezuela, a city in Páez municipality
 Río Chico (parish), in the  municipality of Páez, Miranda

See also
 Chico River (disambiguation)